Banach (pronounced  in German,  in Slavic Languages, and  or  in English) is a Jewish surname of Ashkenazi origin believed to stem from the translation of the phrase Son of man (Judaism), combining the Hebrew word 'Ben' (Son of) and Arameic 'Nasha' (Man). Worth mentioning is how the Sephardic surname "Banache" presents a variant with the "-ache" alternative ultima, common in other Jewish surnames such as Farache (see: Verzache), Ayache, Nakache (see: Géraldine Nakache), Harache or Marrache). 

Notable people with this surname include:

Stefan Banach (1892–1945), Polish mathematician
Ed Banach (born 1960), American wrestler
Lou Banach (born 1960), American wrestler
Korneliusz Banach (born 25 January 1994), Polish volleyball player
 Łukasz Banach, birth name of Norman Leto (born 1980), Polish artist in the fields of painting, film, and new media 
Maurice Banach, German footballer
Orest Banach, German-American soccer goalkeeper of Ukrainian descent 
William Banach (1903–1951), American politician, member of the Wisconsin State Assembly

See also

References

Polish-language surnames